Feminist Legal Studies is a triannual peer-reviewed legal journal with an international perspective that focuses on feminist work in all areas of law, legal theory, and legal practice. The journal often publishes critical, interdisciplinary, theoretical feminist studies relevant to law. It is further extended by generating analyzes and debates on women's rights across approaches, critical perspectives, and theories. Feminist Legal Studies focuses not only on post-colonial tasks but also covers the field of law, legal theory, and legal practice in transnational jurisdictions. The journal was established in 1993 and is published by Springer. The editor-in-chief is Ruth Fletcher (Queen Mary University of London).

Abstracting and indexing 
The journal is abstracted and indexed in:

According to the Journal Citation Reports, the journal has a 2020 impact factor of 2.259, ranking it 28th out of 144 journals in the category "Gender Studies".

See also 
 List of women's studies journals

References 

British law journals
Publications established in 1993
Springer Science+Business Media academic journals
Triannual journals
Women's studies journals